America's Choir: Favorite Songs, Hymns, & Anthems is a compilation album released by the Mormon Tabernacle Choir and Orchestra at Temple Square.  The choir was first called "America's Choir" by U.S. President Ronald Reagan.  The choir has performed at the inaugurations of United States Presidents Lyndon B Johnson (1965), Richard M Nixon (1969), Ronald Reagan (1981), George Bush (1989), George W Bush (2001), and Donald Trump (2016).  They also performed at the American Bicentennial, US Constitution bicentennial celebration, 2002 Winter Olympics (national anthem), and national broadcasts honoring the passing of US Presidents Franklin D Roosevelt and John F Kennedy.

The selections in this recording bring together favorite songs, hymns, and anthems from the Choir's repertoire. Other songs and anthems in this collection speak of the many facets of life: “Cindy” is a rousing folk song; “O Home Beloved,” a plaintive remembrance; “Come Thou Fount of Every Blessing,” a stirring tribute to the grace of God, “Climb Ev’ry Mountain,” the reach for dreams yet unrealized, “Battle Hymn of the Republic” the anthem that made the Choir famous.

Track listing

Charts

Charts

References

Tabernacle Choir albums
2004 compilation albums